Gerben Gerardus Johannes Broeren (born 19 December 1972) is a track cyclist from the Netherlands. He competed in the men's team pursuit at the 1992 Summer Olympics, finishing 12th.

See also
 List of Dutch Olympic cyclists

References

1972 births
Living people
Dutch male cyclists
Olympic cyclists of the Netherlands
Cyclists at the 1992 Summer Olympics
People from Sint-Michielsgestel
Cyclists from North Brabant